Beer tasting is a way to learn more about the history, ingredients and production of beer as well as different beer styles, hops, yeast and beer presentation. A common way is to analyse the appearance, smell and taste of the beer. Then a final judgement of the beer's quality is done. There are many scales for rating beer among beer journalists and beer experts. Different magazines and experts often use their own scale, for example the famous British sommelier Jancis Robinson uses a scale between 1 and 20 and the famous American sommelier Joshua M. Bernstein uses a scale between 1 and 100. However it is common for professional organisations such as the Wine & Spirit Education Trust to rate beer with verbal grades: faulty - poor - acceptable - good - very good - outstanding, corresponding to a scale from 1 to 5.

Themes
First, a selection of beers is chosen for the tasting. A theme can be for example Belgian beers or a selection of beers of varying bitterness. Beers are often tasted in an order from lightest to heaviest, driest to sweetest and cheapest to most expensive. This forms a basic structure of the tasting, but it is more important to organise the tasting according to how the human tastebuds work. As tasting progresses, the tastebuds become less sensitive and can even be anaesthesised. After the beers have been chosen, suitable snacks are provided and information about each beer producer and region is given. To make the tasting diverse, four to six different beers to taste at the same time are generally provided. Interesting tasting themes can be for example different types of beer such as stout, wheat beer or India pale ale, different countries such as Belgian beers or American pale ales. It is also common to couple the beers with various food, such as a tasting of beers and cheeses.

Glass
Choosing a glass for beer tasting is more important than one might think. An ISO standard tasting glass is often used in professional tastings, which is the standard for tasting different beverages. This type of glass is used by many tasters throughout the world to ensure the glass does not affect their judgement. The glass should be large enough to capture the aroma of the beer when it is twisted around on the bottom of the glass. The glass should have a foot so that the container part is not stained or warmed by the hands.

Blind tasting
A common form of beer tasting is so-called blind tasting. In this type of tasting the taster does not know which beer is in which glass, for example by shrouding the bottle in an opaque container as it is poured. An experienced taster can have an idea of what the beer is by clues in the beer's appearance, smell and taste. This is however becoming more difficult as the number of different beer brands and styles is growing.

References

Beer
Gustation